Coolrain, is a village in County Laois, Ireland. It is situated near the Slieve Bloom Mountains. The nearest town is Mountrath, and the closest  village is Camross.

In 1828 Coolrain was spelt Coleraine and was in the parish of Offerlane, Queens County (which is now called County Laois) 

In 1855 Coolrain had a corn and flour mill, a dispensary and police barracks.

In 1901 the population of Coolrain's townlands, was 304, and by 1911 the population was 364.
The townlands of Coolrain in 1901 and 1911 were:  Anatrim/Anatrin, Coolnagour (1828 Colenagour), Coolrain (1828 Coleraine), Derryduff, Derrynaseera (1828 Dernaserea), Glebe, Larch Hill, Laurel Hill, Shanderry, Tinnakill (1828 Tennakilly).

References

Towns and villages in County Laois